Arachnopeziza estonica is a species of fungus belonging to the family Arachnopezizaceae.

The species was found in 2020 in Estonia.

References

Helotiales
Environment of Estonia